Seitz Branch is a stream in Wayne County in the U.S. state of Missouri. It is a tributary of Big Lake Creek.

Seitz Branch was named after E. B. Seitz, an early settler.

See also
 List of rivers of Missouri

References

Rivers of Wayne County, Missouri
Rivers of Missouri